Lucius Hirtuleius was a legate of Quintus Sertorius during the Sertorian War, in which he fought from 80 BC until his death in 75 BC. He is considered Sertorius's most trusted lieutenant, his second-in-command, and was often given independent commands. During the war he defeated the Roman governors Marcus Domitius Calvinus and Lucius Manlius.

Biography  

Not much is known of Hirtuleius's early life and career. He shows up in historical records on the staff of Quintus Sertorius during the latter's propraetorship of the Iberian peninsula. In 82 BC, during Rome's civil war, Sertorius one of the more prominent leaders of the Cinna-Marius faction and those loyal to him, were sent to the Iberian peninsula to establish their faction's rule there. They were driven from the peninsula in 81 BC, but were able to return in 80 BC starting what would become known as the Sertorian War. Hirtuleius was a member of Sertorius's entourage, and helped him establish an independent state in Hispania.

The Sertorian War
Hirtuleius became Sertorius's most trusted lieutenant during what was to become the war on the Iberian peninsula. In 80 BC, while Sertorius was consolidating his power in Hispania Ulterior, Hirtuleius was sent against Marcus Domitius Calvinus, the governor of Hispania Citerior. Hirtuleius resorted to guerrilla warfare, falling back before the enemy and using ambuscades and raids to wear them down, eventually, he defeated Domitius Calvinus at Consabura on the banks of the river Anas. In 78 BC, the new governor of Hispania Citerior, Quintus Calidius, showed so little interest in defending the province, that Lucius Manlius, the propraetor of Gallia Transalpina, was called on to intervene, only to be defeated by Hirtuleius at Ilerda.

In 76 BC the Senate sent massive reinforcements under the general Gnaeus Pompey Magnus to aid Quintus Caecilius Metellus Pius, the commander in charge of the war against Sertorius. When Pompey arrived in Iberia he was outgeneraled and defeated by Sertorius at the Battle of Lauron. The next year Sertorius left Pompey, who had remained in Hispania Citerior with the remnants of his army, to two of his legates, Marcus Perpenna and Gaius Herennius, while he himself campaigned against  Metellus in Hispania Ulterior. Unfortunately for Sertorius, Perpenna and Herennius were defeated by Pompey at Valentia. Sertorius now raced to Hispania Citerior and took over the command against Pompey. He left Hirtuleius in command of the army facing Metellus.

The Battle of Italica

Hirtuleius tried to defeat his opponent in a battle near the Roman colony of Italica. At dawn Hirtuleius mustered his army and marched on Metellus's encampment trying to provoke his opponent into battle. Metellus, however, kept his troops in his camp behind their entrenchments until noon. It was extremely hot and Hirtuleius's troops were soon sweltering out in the open while Metellus's legionaries remained relatively fresh. Since his enemy remained drawn up in front of his camp for hours, Metellus had plenty of time to study their dispositions and make his own plans accordingly. He observed that Hirtuleius had posted his strongest units in the centre of his battle line and decided to use this to his advantage. When the battle finally commenced Metellus held back his own centre and concentrated on winning on the flanks. After routing their opponents his wings enveloped Hirtuleius centre. Hirtuleius lost 20,000 men and fled north to join his commander Sertorius who was squaring off against Pompey. Metellus followed Hirtuleius wanting to make the most of his victory by trapping Sertorius between Pompey and himself.

The Battle of Saguntum

Several weeks later Hirtuleius faced Metellus again, commanding one of Sertorius's wings at the Battle of Saguntum. During the battle Hirtuleius's wing was pushed back by Metellus's legions, he died in the fighting.

See also
 Hirtuleia gens
 Battle of Italica
 Battle of Saguntum (75 BC)

Notes and References

Bibliography
 Howard H. Scullard, From the Gracchi to Nero: A History of Rome from 133 B.C. to A.D. 68, Psychology Press (1982).
 Philip O. Spann, Quintus Sertorius and the Legacy of Sulla, University of Arkansas Press (1987).
 Philip Matyszak, Sertorius and the Struggle for Spain, Pen & Sword Books Ltd (2013).

1st-century BC Romans
Ancient Roman exiles
Ancient Roman generals
Ancient Romans killed in action